The 1976 U.S. Women's Open was the 31st U.S. Women's Open, held July 8–12 at Rolling Green Golf Club in Springfield, Pennsylvania, a suburb west of Philadelphia.

JoAnne Carner, the 1971 champion, won in a Monday playoff over defending champion Sandra Palmer by a score of  The two had tied at 292 (+8), four strokes ahead of

Past champions in the field

Source:

Final leaderboard
Sunday, July 11, 1976

(a) = amateur
Source:

Playoff
Monday, July 12, 1976

Source:

References

External links
Golf Observer final leaderboard
U.S. Women's Open Golf Championship
Rolling Green Golf Club

U.S. Women's Open
Golf in Pennsylvania
Sports competitions in Pennsylvania
U.S. Women's Open
U.S. Women's Open
U.S. Women's Open
Women's sports in Pennsylvania